Parasitica (the parasitican wasps) is an obsolete, paraphyletic infraorder of Apocrita containing the parasitoid wasps. It includes all Apocrita except for the Aculeata. Parasitica has more members as a group than both the Symphyta and the Aculeata combined. 

Parasitica also contains groups of phytophagous hymenopterans such as the Cynipoidea (gall wasps).

References

External links 
 Parasitica at bugguide

 
Insect infraorders
Paraphyletic groups